The 1933 Ice Hockey World Championships were held between February 18 and February 26, 1933, in Prague, Czechoslovakia.

By winning its first-ever world championship, the United States deprived Canada of the world title for the first time in tournament history. The American team, the Massachusetts Rangers, was mostly made up of university students and led by standout performances of Gerry Cosby in goal and team captain Ben Langmaid on defence. Canada was represented by the Toronto National Sea Fleas, winners of the 1932 Allan Cup, and coached by the controversial hockey personality Harold Ballard. The teams met on February 26 at Zimní stadión on Štvanice island. Tied 1-1 after 45 minutes of regulation time on goals by Sherman Forbes for the United States and an equalizer by Canadian Tim Kerr, defenceman John Garrison beat Canadian goalie Ron Geddes at the 6-minute mark of a dramatic "non-sudden death" overtime period.

Ten nations played in three groups, with the top two in each group advancing to the second round to join Canada and the United States, who both were automatically qualified through to the next round. In the second round, eight teams played in two groups; the top two teams from each group advancing to the semifinals, where the top qualifier in each group were seeded against the second qualifier in the opposing group. The winners of the semifinal matches played in the gold medal game, while the losers played for third place.

Fifth and sixth places were decided by a match between the third-place finishers in the two second ground groups; similarly seventh and eighth places were decided between the two last-place finishers in the second round groups. For the final four places, two classification matches were played between the bottom four finishers in the first round, which provided the seedings for the ninth and eleventh-place matches.

First round
February 18 to February 20.  Ten nations played in three groups with the top two in each group advancing to the second round to join Canada and the USA.

Group A
Austria 3 - 0 Italy
Czechoslovakia 8 - 0 Romania
Italy 2 - 0 Romania
Czechoslovakia 2 - 1 Austria
Austria 7 - 1 Romania
Czechoslovakia 3 - 1 Italy

Final Standings – Group A

Group B
Germany 6 - 0 Belgium
Germany 2 - 0 Poland
Poland 1 - 0 Belgium

Final Standings – Group B

Group C
Switzerland 5 - 1 Latvia
Switzerland 1 - 0 Hungary
Hungary 3 - 0 Latvia

Final Standings – Group C

Second round
February 21 to February 23.  Eight teams played in two groups with the top two teams from each group advancing to the semi-finals.

Group D
Austria 1 - 0 o.t. Hungary
Canada 5 - 0 Germany
Germany 4 - 0 Hungary
Canada 4 - 0 Austria
Canada 3 - 1 Hungary
Austria 2 - 0 Germany

Final Standings – Group D

Group E
United States 7 - 0 Switzerland
Czechoslovakia 1 - 0 Poland
United States 4 - 0 Poland
Czechoslovakia 1 - 0 Switzerland
Switzerland 3 - 1 Poland
United States 6 - 0 Czechoslovakia

Final Standings – Group E

Final round

Semi-finals
February 25
United States 4 - 0 Austria
Canada 4 - 0 Czechoslovakia

Consolation round 9–12  February 24
Romania 3 - 2 Belgium
Latvia 2 - 0 Italy

Finals
Gold Medal Game February 26
United States 2 - 1 o.t. Canada

Third-place game February 26
Czechoslovakia 2 - 0 Austria

Fifth-place game February 24
Germany 1 - 1 Switzerland

Seventh-place game February 24
Hungary 1 - 1 Poland

Ninth-place game February 24
Romania 1 - 0 Latvia

Eleventh-place game
Italy w/o Belgium (Belgium declined to play)

Final Rankings – World Championship

Championship team

Final Rankings – European Championship

Legacy
The United States' oldest active college hockey award, the Walter Brown Award, was created in 1953 to commemorate the 20th anniversary of this championship team and its coach, the eponymous Walter A. Brown.
A team photograph, and a gold medal on loan from the family of Sherman Forbes, are currently on display at The Sports Museum in Boston, Massachusetts.

Sources
Complete results
IIHF 100 top stories number 78

References

IIHF Men's World Ice Hockey Championships
International ice hockey competitions hosted by Czechoslovakia
World Championships
Ice Hockey World Championships
Sports competitions in Prague
1930s in Prague